3RRR (pronounced "Three Triple R", or simply "Triple R") is an Australian community radio station, based in Melbourne.

3RRR first commenced broadcasting in 1976 from the studios of 3ST, the student radio station of the Royal Melbourne Institute of Technology (now RMIT University), on an educational licence with the name 3RMT. In 1979 it relocated to Fitzroy, and adopted its present name. During the late 1970s and early 1980s, it became synonymous with the post punk and new wave subcultures. In late 2004, supporters raised enough money for the station to purchase and move into new premises on the corner of Blyth and Nicholson Streets in Brunswick East after the 20-year lease on their previous studios, in Victoria St, Fitzroy, expired.

3RRR's mission statement was defined in 1990 as "To educate, inform and entertain by drawing upon appropriate community resources. To develop a critical approach to contemporary culture." 
Triple R's programming is split roughly 70% specialist music and 30% talk-based shows. Hosts have creative control over content and the station does not have playlists. As such, the nature of 3RRR broadcasts varies wildly depending on the time of the week. As 3RRR states, "With the exception of [the] Breakfasters, all of Triple R’s programs are presented by volunteers" who present their shows for no remuneration. A select few volunteer presenters are also in paid work at the station in operational roles.

3RRR's operations are funded entirely by community sponsorships and public subscribers (currently around 15,000), which, by removing standard commercial pressures, allows for this diverse programming. The estimated current listenership is 440,000 per week.

Due to the reaction from subscribers, in the late 1990s 3RRR cancelled sponsorship deals signed with the Ford Motor Company and music venue The Mercury Lounge (due to its location in Melbourne's Crown Casino). No such "corporate" sponsorship of this type has been considered since.

In 2009, 3RRR opened its performance space for live music, live comedy and literary events among others.

In 2016, 3RRR was inducted into the Music Victoria Hall of Fame.

Past programs

 Against The Arctic (ceased 2011)
 All over the shop
 The Architects (ceased 2014)
 Atomic (ceased 2007)
 Aural Text (ceased 2013)
 Beats Electric (ceased 2009)
 Bedlam
 Best of the Brat (ceased)
 Blokes You Can Trust
 Burn Rubber (ceased 2006)
 Bullying The Jukebox
 Can You Dig It
 The Cheese Shop (ceased 1999)
 Chicken Mary
 Coodabeen Champions
 Cocoa Butter (ceased)
 Cyber 
 Dance Cadaverous
 Deep Sea Music Show
 Delivery
 Discrete Music Show
 Drivetime in Iceland
 Erotic City
 Fast Fictions (ceased 1996)
 Dirty Deeds (ceased 2014)
 Dynamite
 The F'n'K Show
 Feed Your Head (ceased)
 Film Buffs Forecast (ceased)
 Galactic Zoo (ceased 2007)
 Give Men A Pause (1979–1981)
 Greening the Apocalypse (ceased 2019)
 Guy Smiley Presents
 Heathers on Fire (ceased 2014)
 Hellzapoppin' (ceased 2014)
 Italmusic (1984/1988)
 Incoming
 I'd Rather Jack (ceased 2009)
 Keystrokes (ceased 1992)
 Kinky Afro (ceased 2014)
 Know Your Product (1978)
 Lawyers, Guns, & Money
 Lime Champions (ceased 2013)
 Long Grass Sessions (ceased)
 Midweek Crisis (ceased)
 Morning Dawning
 New, Used & Abused (ceased 2000)
 No Pants (ceased 2014)
 No Way Back
 Noise in My Head
 Old Folk Show (ceased 2006)
 Osso Booko Show (1991–1997)
 The Pinch (ceased)
 Plonk (podcast and broadcast during Summer 2008/09)
 Punter to Punter
 Rack Your Brains (ceased)
 Rhythmatic (ceased)
 Run Like You Stole Something (ceased 2008)
 Sitelines (ceased)
 Slanted And Enchanted (ceased 2006)
 Smoke 'Em If You Got 'Em (ceased 2009)
 The Spin (ceased 2006)
 Spoke (ceased 2016)
 Storm the Studio (ceased)
 Street Talk
 Symbiosis (ceased 2007)
 Top Billin
 Top Ranking Sound (ceased 2007)
 Tomorrow Never Knows
 Transference
 Trash Is My Life
 Underground Flavas (ceased 2005)
 The Liars' Club (Ceased 1995)
 The Village
 Wake in Fright (ceased 2006)
 Wax Lyrical
 Weird Groovin'
 Wig-Wam Bam
 Wired for Sound
 The Word (2001–2008)
 Wordburner (ceased 2007)

Selected list of presenters, past and present

 Adam Crow (a.k.a. Bob Console) (Keystrokes)
 Adam Joseph (The Liars' Club 1992–1995)
 Andrew Haug (The Hard Report)
 Alan Parkes (Osso Booko Show)
 Allan Thomas (The Metal for Melbourne Show)
 Amy Mullins (Uncommon Sense)
 Annaliese Redlich (Neon Sunset)
 Alan Eaton (Osso Booko Show)
 Anita Alphabet (Test Pattern)
 Anthony Carew (The International Pop Underground)
 Areej Nur (The Rap)
 'Bandicoot' (Osso Booko Show)
 Billy Baxter (The Coodabeen Champions)
 Bohdan X (Friday punk show, 1978–1995)
 'Brain' (Rack Your Brains)
 Brendan Hitchens (Bullying The Jukebox)
 Bruce Berryman (Sitelines, Metropolis Now)
 Bruce Milne (Where Yo Is?)
 Brian Wise & Billy Pinnell (Off The Record)
 Bruce Berryman (Sitelines)
 Cam Smith (Eat It)
 Carlos T (Hood Pass)
 Casey Bennetto (Superfluity)
 Cerise Howard (Plato's Cave)
 Clinton Walker (Know Your Product, 1978)
 Chris Kennett (The Pinch 2002–2009 / Unexplained Phenomena 2000–2002)
 Chris Hatzsis
 Christos Tsiolkas (Superfluity)
 Claire Hedger (Australian Matinee)
 Craig Kamber
 Headley Gritter (The Party Show)
 Dave O'Neil (Osso Booko Show / Breakfasters)
 Declan Fay (The Pinch 2002–2009 / Unexplained Phenomena 2000–2002)
 Declan Kelly (Against the Arctic)
 Dave Butterworth (Galactic Zoo)
 Dave Graney (Banana Lounge Broadcasting)
 Dave Slutzkin (To and Fro)
 Dave Taranto (The Cheese Shop)
 David Armstrong (Danger: Low Brow)
 David Bridie (Discrete Music Show)
 Davide Carbone (Ryhthmatic)
 David Lescun
 Derek G Smiley (Guy Smiley Presents)
 Dr Turf (Punter to Punter)
 Duane d. Zigliotto (presenter) 1984/1988.
 Elizabeth McCarthy (Multi-Storied)
 Emerald Cowell (Tomorrow Never Knows)
 Ennio Styles (Stylin')
Fran Kelly (Backchat)
 Fiona Scott-Norman (Trash Is My Life, The F'n'K Show)
 Greig Pickhaver
 Genevieve Blackmore (a.k.a. Genny B) (LiveWire)
 Geraldine Hickey (Breakfasters)
 Greg Champion (The Coodabeen Champions)
 Gary Young (Chicken Mary Show)
 Georgia Webster (Byte into It / Superlinguo on Breakfasters)
 Holly C (a.k.a. Marieke Hardy), Glenny G (a.k.a. Glen Dickie) & Paul P (a.k.a. Paul Trapani) (Best of the Brat)
 Howard Marklin (Networks, Discrete Music Show)
 Ian Drysdale (The Liars' Club 1992–1993)
 Jane Gazzo (Calamity 1992–1996)
 Janet A McLeod (The Cheese Shop)
 James Young (The Breakfasters/former Program Director)
 Jason Moore (Local And/Or General)
 Jess McGuire (Breakfasters, Wired For Sound, I'd Rather Jack)
 Josh Kinal & Meshel Laurie (Enough Rope)
Jonathan Alley (Under the Sun/Tough Culture)
 Jon Clyne (a.k.a. Johnnie Wafer) (Keystrokes)
 John Safran (breakfasters)
 Julian Schiller (Crud)
 Johnny Topper (New & Groovy
 Josh Nelson (Plato's Cave)
 Justin Kemp (Run Like You Stole Something)
 Kate Bathgate (Tranzmission)
 Kate Kingsmill (Banana Lounge Broadcasting)
 Kate Langbroek (The F'n'K Show / Breakfasters)
 Karen Leng (Kinky Afro)
 Lady Erica (Underground Flavas)
 Lawrence Hudson (New, Used & Abused)
 Louise Irving (Multi-Storied)
 Luke Pocock (Set It Out)
 Max Crawdaddy (Son of Crawdaddy)
 Matt Rocke (Cyber) Australian Electronic
 Mark O'Toole (Osso Booko Show)
 Namila Benson
 Nick Davis (Feed Your Head)
 Neil Rogers (The Australian Mood, member of The Bo-Weevils)
 Owen McKern (Delivery)
 Paul Harris & John Flaus (Filmbuff's Forecast)
 Phil Wales (Byte into It / Monday Yawning)
 Philip Brophy & Bruce Milne (EEEK!)
 Richard Watts (SmartArts)
 'Rochachelli' (Osso Booko Show)
 Rob Jan (Zero G)
 Rob Steezy (Hood Pass)
 Sam Pang (Breakfasters)
 Santo Cilauro
 Stephen Oliver, Kraig Krieger & John Williams (Steve & The Board / Cut The Music)
 Steve Wide (Far and Wide) New UK Indie 
 Stephen Walker (The Skullcave / former Program Director)
 Stratos Pavlis (Some Velvet Morning & Breakfasters)
 Stuart Harrison (The Architects)
 Stuart Harvey (Mondo Bizarro)
 Systa BB (The Good, The Dub & The Global)
 Tim Cole (Deep Sea Music Show)
 Tim Thorpe (Vital Bits)
 Tim Shiel (To and Fro)
 Tara Judah (Plato's Cave)
 Tracee Hutchison (The Word 2001–2007/Program Director 2002–2005)
 Tony Wilson (The Breakfasters)
 Tony Biggs (The Big Stain, On the Blower)
 Tracy Harvey (Punter to Punter)
 Thomas Caldwell (Plato's Cave)
 Troy Rainbow (Arts Diary)
 Vanessa Toholka (Byte into It)
 Vanda Hamilton (The Liars' Club 1994–1995)
 Vic Plume (Osso Booko Show)
 Warren Davies (Byte into It)
 Zan Rowe (Transit Lounge)
Zerin Dellal (Ms Informed)

Awards

Music Victoria Awards
The Music Victoria Awards are an annual awards night celebrating Victorian music. They commenced in 2006.

|-
| Music Victoria Awards of 2016
| 3RRR
| Hall of Fame
| 
|-

References

External links
3RRR official website – includes audio streaming of the broadcast and archive of best shows.
 Mark Phillips 2006. Radio City. Melbourne: Vulgar Press. (history of RRR, released to commemorate the 30th anniversary)
 Dubecki, Larissa The Age. 2006. Rated R. 23 November 2006. (Article on 30 years of 3RRR).

Community radio stations in Australia
Student radio stations in Australia
Radio stations in Melbourne
Radio stations established in 1976
Former entities of RMIT University